Gershon Shafat (6 December 1927 – 16 August 2020) was an Israeli politician who served as a member of the Knesset for Tehiya during the mid-1980s and early 1990s.

Biography
Born Gershon Staub in Vienna, Austria in 1927, Shafat emigrated to Mandatory Palestine in 1934. He was educated at the Moria high school in Tel Aviv, and spent two years studying history and sociology at university.

He became a member of the Bnei Akiva youth movement, and later joined the National Religious Party. In 1946 he was amongst the founders of kibbutz Ein Tzurim. After the kibbutz was conquered by the Jordanian Army, he was a prisoner of war for ten months. When released, he was a member of the group that re-established Ein Tzurim in a new location.

From 1956 until 1958 he worked as the manager of the Purchasing Organisation, and as the Co-ordinator of the Religious Kibbutz Movement's political committee. Between 1961 and 1977 he managed a Tadmor factory.

In 1974 he became a member of the Gush Emunim settlement movement's secretariat, and held the post of political secretary between 1976 and 1979. He joined the new Tehiya party in 1979, and served as its secretary-general until 1985. Placed fifth on the party's list, he was elected to the Knesset in 1984, as Tehiya won five seats. Although he lost his seat in the 1988 elections, he returned to the Knesset on 31 January 1990 as a replacement for Yuval Ne'eman, who had resigned his seat. Shafat lost his seat again in the 1992 elections, in which Tehiya failed to cross the electoral threshold.

He died in August 2020.

References

External links

1927 births
2020 deaths
Austrian emigrants to Mandatory Palestine
Austrian Jews
Israeli activists
Israeli businesspeople
Israeli prisoners of war
Members of the 11th Knesset (1984–1988)
Members of the 12th Knesset (1988–1992)
National Religious Party politicians
Tehiya politicians